The Lincoln LS is a four-door, five-passenger luxury sedan manufactured and marketed by Ford's Lincoln division over a single generation from 1999–2006. Introduced in June 1999 for model-year 2000, the LS featured rear-wheel drive and near 50/50 weight distribution and was available with a V8 or V6, the latter initially offered with a manual transmission.

The LS shared the Ford DEW98 platform with the Jaguar S-Type and the Ford Thunderbird. Trim levels ranged from the base V6 model to the Special Edition V8 LSE trims in 2004, with revised front and rear fascia, taillights and foglights, and front grille.

LS models were manufactured at Ford's Wixom Assembly Plant until production ended on April 3, 2006 and the plant was idled as part of Ford's The Way Forward. Approximately 262,900 were manufactured, including 2,331 with manual transmissions and 1,500 LSE editions.

2000–2002

In 1999, the LS debuted as Lincoln's first rear-wheel drive sport luxury sedan for the 2000 model year, under influence from the newly established Premier Automotive Group.

Lincoln originally intended to market the sedan in two versions, the LS6 and the LS8, the names reflecting their respective engine layouts. Toyota's Lexus division noted concern about the potential name confusion with its Lexus LS and Lincoln ended up using only the name "LS".

In designing the LS to be competitive in its segment, the LS' German-born chief designer, said of the car, "In a segment defined and dominated by BMW and Mercedes, the car had to have a functional, no-nonsense look. This redefines the Lincoln brand, but we still had to make sure it was recognizable as a member of the same family as the Town Car, Continental, Mark VIII, and the Navigator." The LS featured understated exterior and interior styling.

Leather seating surfaces were standard, the steering wheel could be wood- and leather-wrapped, and the interior featured wood accents. Standard features included power windows, power door locks with keyless entry, power heated mirrors, automatic headlights, air conditioning with automatic climate control, cruise control, and an AM/FM cassette radio. Available options included a six-disc in-dash CD changer (only accessible through the glove box initially; changed on later models), power moonroof, and a universal garage door opener.

The LS shared platforms and equipment with the Jaguar S-Type. The DEW98 platform used independent double wishbone (short-long arm; SLA) front and rear suspensions and a  wheelbase. Four-wheel antilock disc brakes were standard along with an optional traction control system, marketed as Ford's AdvanceTrac. Numerous suspension components, as well as the hood, decklid, and front fenders, were aluminum. The LS came with standard 16-inch alloy wheels while 17-inch wheels were available through an optional sport package. The sport package for an extra $1,000 included a stiffer suspension, 17-inch wheels, and manual shift capability for the automatic transmission. The battery of the LS was located in the spare tire well in the car's trunk.

The base LS was powered by an all-aluminum 3.0 L DOHC V6 that was a variant of the Jaguar AJ-V6 engine. Optional in the LS was an all-aluminum 3.9 L DOHC V8, a shorter-stroke variant of the Jaguar 4.0 L AJ-26 V8. Both engines required premium-grade gasoline. Ford's 5R55S five-speed automatic transmission with an optional manual shift ability called SelectShift was standard with either engine, while a Getrag 221 five-speed manual transmission was available for V6-equipped LS models through an optional sport package. Automatic transmission-equipped cars featured a 3.58:1 rear-axle ratio, while manual transmission-equipped versions came with a 3.07:1 rear-axle ratio. Lincoln stopped production of the manual-transmission model LS after 2,331 were manufactured.

The LS was named Motor Trend's Car of the Year for 2000 and was nominated for the North American Car of the Year award, as well.

The powertrain control module in 2000-2002 automatic transmission models with the SelectShift option was originally programmed to prevent launching in first gear; i.e., the car would default to a second gear launch. A first gear launch was available by depressing the throttle more than 60%. Second-gear launches were programmed to meet EPA fuel economy regulations . For the model year 2003, first-gear launches were programmed into the transmission, reflecting revised fuel economy regulations.

In 2002, the LSE (Limited Special Edition) package was introduced in V6 and V8 versions, with a revised fascia including round fog lamp openings and a special metallic grille treatment, and with enlarged lower body rocker panels, special wheels, and twin dual-exhaust tailpipes.

2003–2006

The LS received a refresh for 2003, coinciding with Lincoln's then-new "Travel Well" ad campaign. The exterior received HID headlamps (optional) and a revised trunklid with revised taillights. Both available engines received a boost in power and torque, as well as slightly improved fuel efficiency. The 3.0 L DOHC V6 with which the LS was introduced now featured continuously variable intake cam timing, improved variable-length intake runners, and electronic "drive-by-wire" throttle control (which replaced the traditional mechanical cable-linked throttle control system used previously). The optional 3.9 L DOHC V8 with which the LS was also introduced received variable exhaust-valve timing. Other notable additions to the LS included an electronic push-button parking brake (similar to that of the BMW E65 7 Series), replacing the traditional center console-mounted hand lever (or foot pedal), a touchscreen DVD satellite navigation map system, and an industry-first, 10-speaker THX-certified sound system. LSE versions were also available in the 2004 and 2005 model years, with unique fascia, unique 17-inch wheels, all-red tail lights, a color-keyed grille, unique floormats, and additional wood paneling in the interior.

Earlier LS models had a mechanical engine cooling fan that was operated with a hydraulic pump because the electrical charging system did not have sufficient capacity to effectively power an electric fan. A later revised  alternator enabled the implementation of an electric fan for the 2003-2006 models.

The 2003-2006 GPS navigation system uses a DVD player mounted in the trunk (under the package tray) to contain the map data.

For 2006, the LS received exterior revision similar to LSE fascia trim from previous model years. The V6-powered model was dropped from the lineup. The base MSRP increased from $32,370 in 2004 to $39,285.

Safety
The Lincoln LS has received very high marks in occupant protection. The Insurance Institute for Highway Safety has rated the LS as a "Best Pick" with a perfect score in their frontal offset crash test. The National Highway Traffic Safety Administration gave the LS almost perfect scores in its side-impact and rollover tests. In fact, CNBC rated the LS as “one of the five safest cars of all time.”

Model naming controversy
Lincoln originally intended to designate LS models as "LS6" and "LS8", depending on the engine size option. Toyota threatened a trademark infringement lawsuit, due to the similar naming scheme used on the Lexus LS, while at the same time, Ford threatened a lawsuit regarding the Toyota T150 concept, arguing that the name was too close to that of the F150. Lincoln settled on designating the cars as "LS V6" and "LS V8" and Toyota changed the name of their pickup truck to the Tundra.

Milestones

1999 Lincoln introduced the LS as a 2000 model with a blend of luxury and sport to attract a new generation of buyers to the Lincoln brand.
2000 Motor Trend magazine named the LS “Car of the Year”.
2001 LS earned double five-star frontal safety ratings from the federal government.
2003 More than 500 improvements included a power increase, design changes, and interior updates.
2004 LS earned a “Best Pick” safety rating from the Insurance Institute for Highway Safety.
2006 LS production ended in April after 262,900 were built over 7 years.

Sales

References

External links
 Lincoln LS (archived)

LS
Rear-wheel-drive vehicles
2000s cars
Mid-size cars
Sports sedans
Cars introduced in 1999
Motor vehicles manufactured in the United States